17 km is a rural locality (a settlement) in Semigorodneye Rural Settlement of Kharovsky District, Russia. The population was 37 as of 2002.

Geography 
17 km is located 107 km southeast of Kharovsk (the district's administrative centre) by road. Tomashka is the nearest rural locality.

Streets 
There are no streets with titles.

References 

Rural localities in Kharovsky District